The second season of Taking The Stage premiered on January 28, 2010 and concluded on April 15, 2010 with an order of 12 episodes.  It continued to follow the trials and tribulations of students at SCPA.  This season the series changed it format from 1 hour episodes, to a 30-minute format, despite a couple of episodes. It has been confirmed by several students from the class of 2010 that the cast of this season were not in fact real students of the school, excluding Tyler Nelson, who graduated and returned to reprise his role in season 1. MTV found them in various states and they were hired to act in a "situational reality" series. In this season, unlike last, the cast is interviewed so the viewer can hear their thoughts during the show unlike last season where the viewer had to rely on simply conversations, facial expressions, and the soundtracks.

This is the final season of the series.

Cast
The following is a list of cast members presents in this season.

  Main Cast Member
  Secondary Cast Member

Main Cast Bios
Tyler Nelson- A senior and dance major who is continuing his education that he started last season, along with a new hip-hop class where he can do what he does best. He and Aris are still  in Black Rain and he begins a relationship with Emily Silber; who caught his attention in hip-hop class. He also creates a rivalry with Carlton and is often fairly mean to him, effectively putting Carlton into the same position he was in when he was a junior and had a rivalry with Malik.
Emily Silber- A senior who transferred from Saint Ursula Academy (an all girl Catholic school in Cincinnati) just to be able to pursue her dancing career at SCPA.  She also happens to catch Tyler's interest.
Adam Calvert - A junior and vocal music major. He was home-schooled in Tennessee for a very long time before coming here, where girls Emily Sones and Holly start to crush on him. He asks Holly out only to find out that she is cheating on her boyfriend with him and he ends it with her. His grandmother has cancer and is his inspiration. He harbours feelings for Emily Sones and we see this later on when he grows jealous of her relationship with Ian.
Ian Watts- A senior and tech theater and drama major. He is actually a rapper and hopes to become the "first big rapper out of Cincinnati". He has a relationship with Emily Sones, which makes Adam jealous, although they are friends.
Anna Lisa-Flinchbaugh- A junior and dance major who has scoliosis and due to a titanium screw in her back greatly limits her flexibility in her dancing. She is very attractive and tries her best to perform in order to prove to everyone that she is capable even with limitations. She is a devout Christian and begins a good friendship with Emily Sones. Carlton is always trying to catch her attention and the two grow closer; eventually forming a relationship.
Carlton Totten-A junior and vocal, drama and dance major. In his previous school he was teased for being into the performing arts and when he comes to SCPA he gets a lot of grief from Tyler who puts Carlton in the same situation that he was in with Malik in season one.
Emily Sones- A sophomore and vocal music major.  She has a crush on Adam and writes a song about him; but after seeing him with Holly, she decides to start a relationship with Ian, making Adam jealous.
Holly Angel - A junior and a drama/vocal major. Holly was a true SCPA student of five years prior to the airing of the show. Referred to as the "hot, sexy, party girl". Holly is the source of the shows entertaining drama. She catches Adam's eye from day one and knocks out Emily's chances of getting Adam.

Episodes
1 Denotes a 1-hour episode.

References

External links
Season 2 on MTV

2010 American television seasons